"Stay with Me" is a song by English rock band Faces, written jointly by lead singer Rod Stewart and guitarist Ronnie Wood. Released from the band's third studio album A Nod Is As Good As a Wink... to a Blind Horse (1971), it became their only major hit in the United States, although they had a further three Top 20 singles in the UK chart.  The song has also appeared on various Faces compilations and on albums by both songwriters. The lyrics describe a woman named Rita, who has a face that she has "nothing to laugh about", and with whom the singer proposes a one-night stand, on the condition that she be gone when he wakes up.

"Stay with Me" reached number 17 on the US Billboard Hot 100 and spent two weeks at number 10 on the Cash Box Top 100. The song also reached number 6 in the UK Singles Chart and number 4 in Canada.

Re-recordings and cover versions
In 1993 Stewart, reunited with Wood for MTV Unplugged, recorded a live version of the song, which appears on the 1993 album Unplugged...and Seated (1993).

Def Leppard covered the song on Yeah! "Phil [Collen, guitarist] sang 'Stay with Me'," noted singer Joe Elliott. "It's his best Rod Stewart impression. I played the Fender Rhodes, he got to sing. There was a lot of instrument-swapping going on. Vivian [Campbell, guitarist] played some great Ronnie Wood slide guitar."

The band Train covered the song on their 2004 album Alive at Last.

In 2007, the song was covered by McFly as a b-side to their single "Do Ya" which was released for Children in Need

In 2019, Mary J. Blige covered the song for the soundtrack of The Umbrella Academy.

Personnel
Rod Stewart – lead vocals
Ronnie Wood – guitar, slide guitar
Ian McLagan – Wurlitzer electronic piano
Ronnie Lane – bass  
Kenney Jones – drums

Charts

Weekly charts

Year-end charts

Certifications

References

External links
 

1971 songs
1971 singles
Faces (band) songs
Rod Stewart songs
Songs written by Rod Stewart
Song recordings produced by Glyn Johns
Song recordings produced by Rod Stewart
Songs written by Ronnie Wood
Warner Records singles